Xenophrys serchhipii is a species of frog in the family Megophryidae, known from a single specimen from Serchhip, Mizoram, India.

References

serchhipii
Endemic fauna of India
Amphibians of India
Amphibians described in 2007